Catherine Fiona King (born 2 June 1966) is an Australian politician serving as the Minister for Infrastructure, Transport, Regional Development and Local Government since 2022 and as the Member of Parliament (MP) for Ballarat since 2001. She is a member of the Australian Labor Party (ALP) and briefly served as a minister in the Gillard and Rudd Governments in 2013. She served as Shadow Minister of Health from 2013 to 2019 and as Shadow Minister for Infrastructure, Transport and Regional Development from 2019 to 2022.

Early life 
King was born in Melbourne on 2 June 1966. She completed her secondary education at Emmaus College. She subsequently completed the degrees of Bachelor of Social Work at the Phillip Institute of Technology and Master of Public Policy at the Australian National University. She completed a Bachelor of Laws at Deakin University in 2018, and was admitted as a lawyer in Victoria in 2021.

King worked as a social worker at Ballarat Children's Homes and Family Services from 1988 to 1992, and in 1991 was named Victorian Young Achiever of the Year in the field of community services. In the same year she spent six months working in Birmingham, England, which influenced her later decision to enter politics. King subsequently joined the Australian Public Service, working as an industry policy officer for the Australia New Zealand Food Authority (1993–1994) and as a senior officer in the Department of Health and Aged Care (1997–1999). She served as assistant director of the department's population health division and later as director of injury prevention. While in the public service she lived in Canberra, spending periods in Narrabundah, Hughes and Swinger Hill. King later moved back to Victoria and joined the private sector as a senior manager in KPMG's consulting division.

Politics 

King joined the Australian Labor Party in 1993 and worked briefly as a research officer for Andrew Theophanous, the parliamentary secretary for health in the Keating Government. She served as president of the party's Port Melbourne branch from 1998 to 1999.

King is a member of Labor Left.

Opposition (2001–2007)
King was the only Labor candidate to win a seat at the 2001 election from the Liberal Party of Australia, and secured a 5.5-point swing, the largest swing to a Labor candidate in the poll. She was likely helped when the Liberals' initial candidate, Olympic gold medallist Russell Mark, resigned three months before the election, whereas King had 18 months to campaign. She maintained her seat at the 2004, 2007, 2010, 2013, and 2016 federal elections.

King was re-elected in the 2004 federal election with a slightly reduced majority and was then appointed the Shadow Parliamentary Secretary for Regional Development. In mid-2005 she was then promoted to Shadow Parliamentary Secretary for Treasury.

Government (2007–2013)
King was re-elected for a third term at the 2007 federal election, increasing her majority from 2.2 to 8.15 points. In the 2010 federal election she increased her margin to 11.7 points.

King was appointed to serve in the Second Gillard Ministry and was sworn in by Governor-General Quentin Bryce on 14 September 2010 as the Parliamentary Secretary for Health and Ageing and the Parliamentary Secretary for Infrastructure and Transport. On 25 March 2013, King was appointed to the Ministry as the Minister for Regional Services, Local Communities and Territories and the Minister for Road Safety and sworn in by Governor-General Quentin Bryce. Following the June 2013 Labor leadership spill, she was appointed as the Minister for Regional Australia, Local Government and Territories in the Second Rudd Ministry and promoted into the Australian Cabinet.

Opposition (2013–2022)
Despite the defeat of the second Rudd Government in the 2013 federal election King retained her seat with a margin of 4.9 points. Following the election of Bill Shorten as Labor Leader, King was appointed to shadow cabinet as Labor Health spokesperson. King was re-elected for a sixth time in the July 2016 federal election, increasing her margin to 7.3 points, and retained her position as Shadow Minister for Health. Following the 2019 election, she was retained in Anthony Albanese's shadow ministry and given the portfolio of Shadow Minister for Infrastructure, Transport and Regional Development.

Government (2022–)
Following the 2022 federal election, King was appointed Minister for Infrastructure, Transport, Regional Development and Local Government in the Albanese ministry.

See also 

 2013 Australian federal election
 2010 Australian federal election
 2007 Australian federal election
 2004 Australian federal election
 2001 Australian federal election

References

External links 
 

Official Australian Parliament website for Catherine King
Official Facebook page of Catherine King
Official Twitter page of Catherine King
Official ALP webpage for Catherine King

|-

|-

|-

|-

 

1966 births
Living people
Politicians from Melbourne
Public servants from Melbourne
Australian Labor Party members of the Parliament of Australia
Australian public servants
Members of the Australian House of Representatives
Members of the Australian House of Representatives for Ballarat
Women members of the Australian House of Representatives
Labor Left politicians
21st-century Australian politicians
21st-century Australian women politicians
Government ministers of Australia
RMIT University alumni
Australian National University alumni
Australian social workers
Albanese Government